Collingrove Hillclimb is a motor sport facility located in South Australia's Barossa Valley. It is situated approximately 7 km south of Angaston, off the Angaston — Mount Pleasant Road, and is owned and operated by the Sporting Car Club of South Australia. It has been in operation since 1952. The opening meeting was held on 15 March 1952 with J. F. Crouch in a Cooper Mark 5 setting a record for the course of 39.95 seconds.

Collingrove has regularly held Australian Hillclimb Championships and attracted some of Australia's well known motor sport competitors including Eldred Norman, Peter Hollinger, Stan Keen, Norm Beechey and more. The outright hill record is currently held by Brett Hayward driving a Hayward. Other drivers who have previously held the track record include past Australian Hillclimb Champions Kym Rohrlach (VW special), Stan Keen (Elfin) and Peter Gumley (SCV).

The track itself is 750 m of challenging asphalt, climbing nearly 70 m from the start line to the finish. The club has recently upgraded the return road with an asphalt surface. For spectators the track offers many vantage points and picnic areas.

Each year there are Multiclub Events, the four round Wintercup series, Come & Try Days and the South Australian Hillclimb Championships. Collingrove was the venue of the 2017 Australian Hillclimb Championship.

References 
 
Collingrove Hillclimb
Sporting Car Club of SA Inc

External links
 Collingrove Hillclimb (unofficial site)
 Phil Williams Media & Marketing - Images from the 2010 Australian Hillclimb Championship

Hillclimbing
Motorsport venues in South Australia